The 1991 Cronulla-Sutherland Sharks season was the 25th in the club's history. They competed in the NSWRL's 1991 Winfield Cup premiership.

Ladder

References

Cronulla-Sutherland Sharks seasons
Cronulla-Sutherland Sharks season
Cronulla-Sutherland Sharks season